Alberts Glacier is a heavily crevassed glacier in Antarctica.

History
The glacier was photographed from the air by the U.S. Navy in 1968. It was delineated from these photographs by Directorate of Overseas Surveys, 1980, and positioned from surveys by Falkland Islands Dependencies Survey, 1947–57. In association with the names of Antarctic historians around the area, it was named by United Kingdom Antarctic Place-Names Committee after Fred G. Alberts, an American toponymist, and secretary of the Advisory Committee on Antarctic Names 1949–80.

See also
 List of glaciers in the Antarctic
 Glaciology

References

Glaciers of Graham Land
Foyn Coast